Epepeotes desertus is a species of flat-faced longhorns beetle belonging to the family Cerambycidae, subfamily Lamiinae.

Description

Distribution
This species can be found in Indonesia (Moluccas) and Philippines.

List of subspecies
 Epepeotes desertus desertus (Linnaeus, 1758)
 Epepeotes desertus obscurus Aurivillius, 1926
 Epepeotes desertus rhobetor (Newman, 1842)

References
 Biolib
 Catalogue of Life
 Global species
 Laminaires du monde

External links
 F. Vitali Worldwide Cerambycoidea Photo Gallery
 Kaefer der welt

desertus
Beetles described in 1758
Taxa named by Carl Linnaeus